The 2012 South Tyneside Metropolitan Borough Council election took place on 3 May 2012 to elect members of South Tyneside Metropolitan Borough Council in England. This was on the same day as other 2012 United Kingdom local elections. One third (18) of the seats were being contested, of which Labour won 17, and the Conservatives one.

New make-up of the council

Ward results
An asterisk denotes an incumbent.

Beacon & Bents ward

Bede ward

Biddick & All Saints ward

Boldon Colliery ward

Cleadon & East Boldon ward

Cleadon Park ward

Fellgate & Hedworth ward

Harton ward

Hebburn North ward
In 2008, Joe Abbott stood, and won, in this ward as a Liberal Democrat candidate.

Hebburn South ward

Horsley Hill ward

Monkton ward

Primrose ward

Simonside & Rekendyke ward

West Park ward

Westoe ward

Whitburn & Marsden ward

Whiteleas ward

References

2012 English local elections
2012
21st century in Tyne and Wear